is a Japanese koto player noted for her performance of contemporary classical music and free improvisation.

She began studying, at the age of eight, with Michio Miyagi. She later graduated from the Tokyo National University of Fine Arts and Music.

She plays both the 13-string and 17-string kotos. As a soloist, as well as with her koto ensemble, she has performed and worked with John Cage, Toshi Ichiyanagi, Yuji Takahashi, Ayuo, Roberto Carnevale, Sofia Gubaidulina, David Behrman, Carl Stone, and many other composers. She has performed in Japan, North America, and Europe.

She was married to the late Tadao Sawai, who was also a koto player and composer. The couple had a son Hikaru Sawai (b. 1964), who is also a koto player and composer.

She operates a school in Japan, where she teaches both Japanese and foreign students. Her students include Michiyo Yagi, Elizabeth Falconer, Shoko Hikage, and Mei Han.

References

External links
Kazue Sawai official site
Kazue Sawai page
Article about Kazue Sawai by Elizabeth Falconer
Kazue Sawai biography

1941 births
Contemporary classical music performers
Japanese classical musicians
Japanese contemporary classical musicians
Koto players
Living people
Musicians from Kyoto
Tokyo University of the Arts alumni